Social construct may refer to: